ARRAY is an independent distribution company launched by film maker and former publicist Ava DuVernay in 2011 under the name African-American Film Festival Releasing Movement (AFFRM). In 2015, the company rebranded itself as ARRAY.

History
DuVernay launched the company in 2010 after her debut feature film I Will Follow failed to acquire distribution. ARRAY has stated that its mission is to “produce, distribute and amplify work from Black artists, filmmakers of color and women of all kinds.”

In May 2015, DuVernay held a 12-hour Rebel-a-thon on Twitter to raise funds for the company. For 12 hours black directors like Ryan Coogler, John Singleton, Gina Prince-Bythewood, Tina Mabry, Julie Dash and more answered questions from the general public in order to raise awareness for ARRAY and encourage people to donate funds. Actors Thandiwe Newton, Kerry Washington and Jessica Chastain were among those who made substantial donations to the company.

In 2016 ARRAY signed a deal partnering with Netflix to distribute their films online. Since 2016 all ARRAY films have appeared exclusively on Netflix and stay on the platform for three years.

In 2019 the company created the Amanda cinema, named after founder Ava DuVernay's aunt, that was exclusively dedicated to showing films by people of color.

Films distributed

References

External links 

 

Film distributors of the United States
Companies based in Los Angeles
American companies established in 2011
Mass media companies established in 2011
2011 establishments in California
Independent films